David Lynn Thomas (born 1953) is an American singer, songwriter and musician based in Great Britain.

He was one of the founding members of the short-lived proto-punkers Rocket from the Tombs (1974–1975), in which he played under the moniker "Crocus Behemoth," and of post-punk group Pere Ubu (1975–present, intermittently). He has also released several solo albums. Though primarily a singer, he sometimes plays melodeon, trombone, musette, guitar or other instruments.

Thomas has described his artistic focus as being the "gestalt of culture, geography and sound". Common themes crop up throughout much of his work, such as the US Interstate Highway system, images of roadside or "junk" tourist culture, Brian Wilson, AM radio, birds, and many others.

Thomas has a distinctive, high pitched voice; Emerson Dameron described Thomas's singing as "James Stewart trapped in an oboe", and Greil Marcus writes, "Mr Thomas's voice is that of a man muttering in a crowd. You think he's talking to himself until you realize he's talking to you."

Biography
Thomas was an early member of Rocket from the Tombs, which disbanded after about a year. Along with Rocket from the Tombs guitarist Peter Laughner, he then formed Pere Ubu, which was originally active from 1975 to 1982.

Afterwards, Thomas worked with a variety of musicians including guitarists Richard Thompson and Philip Moxham, and Henry Cow alumni bassonist/oboist Lindsay Cooper and drummer Chris Cutler. Initially, his solo recordings eschewed Pere Ubu's "rock" focus. Lindsay Cooper's bassoon was often prominent, and, when Richard Thompson's guitar was not featured, the guitar would be absent (such as the entirety of 1985's More Places Forever). Thomas's lyrics became increasingly whimsical, and birds became a common theme:

 Somewhere along the line, I wrote a song that had birds in it. And then by pure coincidence, another. Some critic asked, "Why all these songs about birds?" And I said to myself, "You think that's a lot of songs about birds?!? I'll show you a lot of songs about birds!" So, for a while, I stuck birds in everywhere I could.

Eventually, several former members of Pere Ubu gravitated into Thomas's group, and by the time of 1987's Blame the Messenger, were sporting a sound distinctly similar to the former band. This fact along with other considerations led directly into the official reformation of Pere Ubu in 1987, and the group has remained active to the present day.

Thomas appears to have been at one point a Jehovah's Witness, an affiliation that has been reflected lyrically in the final song of Pere Ubu's 1979 album New Picnic Time, originally titled "Jehovah's Kingdom Come!" However, in subsequent releases of the album, the song has been re-titled "Hand A Face A Feeling" and then "Kingdom Come"; in the albums' lyric sheet, maintained by Thomas on Pere Ubu's official website, the titular line has been changed to "God's Kingdom Come"; the song itself has been re-mixed to remove references to Jehovah.

Current solo career
Thomas's solo activities were diminished, though not extinguished, by the reformation of Pere Ubu.  Throughout the 1980s, Thomas maintained a rotating trio dubbed the Accordion Club, which at various times included John Kirkpatrick, Chris Cutler, Garo Yellin, and Ira Kaplan. While these groupings tended to share a repertoire with Pere Ubu, the focus was smaller. Thomas stated: "I often use the same songs in both projects ... I can explore the stories behind the songs. I can extend/expand/interpolate those stories." Though the Accordion Club never recorded any albums, two songs appeared on Rē Records Quarterly Vol.2 No.1, and it led to the formation of Thomas's current "solo" project, the Two Pale Boys. Devoted to "spontaneous song generation", they feature Keith Moliné on guitar and Andy Diagram on "trumpet through electronics;" both make frequent use of MIDI, giving them a broader tonal palette than might be expected from two instruments. In addition to singing Thomas frequently plays melodeon. Says Thomas:

Pere Ubu is a big rock experience, often overwhelming in its power and intensity of dataflow. It's a Hollywood blockbuster on a cinemascopic screen. Projects like the [Two Pale Boys] are intended as indy arthouse films.

Thomas typically has a large number of ongoing projects at any one time. He has performed in theatrical productions, including several productions by Hal Willner, and a London West End production of Shockheaded Peter. He has delivered his lecture "The Geography of Sound in the Magnetic Age" at Clark University and UCLA, among other venues.  He has staged his "improvisational opera" Mirror Man at venues in Europe and North America, featuring at various times contributions from many of his previous collaborators, as well as Linda Thompson, Bob Holman, Robert Kidney, Van Dyke Parks, Frank Black, George Wendt, and Syd Straw. In 2010 he performed with the backing of Australian band The Holy Soul.

Most recently he has alternated recording and performances primarily between Pere Ubu, David Thomas and Two Pale Boys, and the reunited Rocket from the Tombs.

Discography

Albums

With Pere Ubu
See Pere Ubu Discography

David Thomas & the Pedestrians
The Sound of the Sand & Other Songs of the Pedestrian (1981)
Variations on a Theme (1983)
More Places Forever (1985)

David Thomas & His Legs
Winter Comes Home (1982) (live -disavowed by Thomas in Monster liner notes)

David Thomas & the Wooden Birds
Monster Walks the Winter Lake (1986)
Blame the Messenger (1987)

David Thomas & Foreigners
Bay City (2000)

David Thomas & Two Pale Boys
Erewhon (1996)
Meadville (1997)
Mirror Man (1999) (as part of The Pale Orchestra)
Surf's Up!! (2001)
18 Monkeys on a Dead Man's Chest (2004)

With Unknown Instructors
The Master's Voice (2007)

David Thomas and P.O. Jørgens 

 Live Free or Diet (CD, LP 2017)

EPs

Vocal Performances (1981)

Compilations

Monster (1997)

Contributions
"Dan Dan" & "Drunken Sailor" on Hal Willner's Rogue's Gallery: Pirate Ballads, Sea Songs, and Chanteys
"The Pigeons, Mr. McKenzie" on the Hat Shoes' Differently Desperate (LP/CD 1992)
"You've Lost That Lovin' Feelin'" and "Paris Blues" on Jackie Leven's Defending Ancient Springs (CD 2000)
"My Spanish Dad" and "Rainy Day Bergen Woman" on Jackie Leven's Creatures Of Light & Darkness (CD 2001)
"Live (The Meeting Of Remarkable Men)" Jackie Leven with Ian Rankin (DVD 2004)
"Red Apple Boy" on The Book of Knots' Train Eater (CD, 2007)

References

External links

 David Thomas official Bio .
 Pere Ubu official site
 David Thomas, Ghoulardi: Lessons in Mayhem from the First Age of Punk, the draft text of a talk by Thomas on Ghoulardi, at April 2005 Pop Conference at Experience Music Project.
David Thomas solo overview at Trouser Press
David Thomas interviews on Outsight Radio Hours

1953 births
American Jehovah's Witnesses
American male singers
American post-punk musicians
American rock singers
American rock songwriters
American singer-songwriters
Living people
Pere Ubu members
Protopunk musicians
Red Krayola members
Rocket from the Tombs members
Rough Trade Records artists
Unknown Instructors members